Jovan Stojanović (born 21 April 1992) is a Serbian footballer who plays as an attacking midfielder.

Club career
In February 2017, he joined Belgian club Kortrijk.

Honours
Vojvodina
Serbian Cup: 2013–14

References

External links
 Jovan Stojanović stats at utakmica.rs 
 
 

1992 births
Living people
Association football midfielders
Footballers from Belgrade
Serbian footballers
Serbian expatriate footballers
Serbian expatriate sportspeople in Belgium
Expatriate footballers in Belgium
Cercle Brugge K.S.V. players
K.S.V. Roeselare players
K.V. Kortrijk players
Challenger Pro League players
Belgian Pro League players
OFK Beograd players
FK Radnički Obrenovac players
FK Vojvodina players
FK Voždovac players
FK Metalac Gornji Milanovac players
Serbian SuperLiga players